Men O' War is the third sound film starring Laurel and Hardy, released on June 29, 1929.

Plot
Stan and Ollie are two sailors on leave who happen upon two attractive girls strolling through a park. The sailors invite the ladies for a soda, but soon realize that they only have enough money for three people. Ollie spends an eternity trying to explain this fact to Stan, who cannot grasp that either he or Ollie will have to forgo a soda. When they finally purchase three sodas, with the plan to share one between Stan and Ollie in which Stan swallows both shares, the price is twice that previously thought. Ollie gets Stan back for drinking his half of the soda by leaving him to pay the check. Realizing he does not have enough and that he has nothing to lose, Stan deposits a coin in a slot machine in the soda shop and ends up hitting the jackpot.

With excess money in hand, the boys rent a rowing boat with the ladies, which results in an all-out battle-royal with other boaters on the lake, with various canoes getting overturned. Eventually all the people who have fallen into the water clamber into Stan and Ollie's boat, which causes it to sink.

Cast

Production notes
Men O' War was written and filmed in May 1929. Most of the film was shot at Hollenbeck Park in Los Angeles, while the soda fountain scene was shot at the Hal Roach studio. The song "Runnin' Wild" was featured over the opening credits for this film as well as They Go Boom.

The difficulties of filming on location during the early sound era were present during the making of Men O' War. Offscreen laughing from passersby present in Hollenbeck Park during filming can be heard, and the sound quality itself suffers from echoing and background noise.

This was James Finlayson's first sound film, and the one in which his trademark exclamation of "D'oh!" appeared (acknowledged by Dan Castellaneta as the progenitor for Homer Simpson's similar expression of disbelief or outrage).

References

External links
 
 
 
 

1929 short films
1929 comedy films
American short films
American black-and-white films
1920s English-language films
Short films directed by Lewis R. Foster
Laurel and Hardy (film series)
Films with screenplays by H. M. Walker
Metro-Goldwyn-Mayer short films
1920s American films